__NoTOC__
The 1977 Australian referendum was held on 21 May 1977. It contained four referendum questions and one non-binding plebiscite.

This referendum had a particularly strong "Yes" vote. All but one of the referendum questions was carried, and the only one to not be carried had a clear national majority, but was held back by not achieving a majority of the states. No referendum since then has been successful.

The four referendum questions were only voted on in the states; voters in the territories only gained the right to vote on constitutional changes as a result of the Referendums amendment passing. Voters in the territories, however, were able to vote on the plebiscite.

Results in detail

Simultaneous Elections
This section is an excerpt from 1977 Australian referendum (Simultaneous Elections) § Results

Senate Casual Vacancies
This section is an excerpt from 1977 Australian referendum (Senate Casual Vacancies) § Results

Referendums
This section is an excerpt from 1977 Australian referendum (Referendums) § Results

Retirement of Judges
This section is an excerpt from 1977 Australian referendum (Retirement of Judges) § Results

National Song
This section is an excerpt from 1977 Australian plebiscite (National Song) § Results

See also
Politics of Australia
History of Australia

Notes

References

Further reading
 Standing Committee on Legislative and Constitutional Affairs (1997) Constitutional Change: Select sources on Constitutional change in Australia 1901–1997 . Australian Government Printing Service, Canberra.
 Bennett, Scott (2003). Research Paper no. 11 2002–03: The Politics of Constitutional Amendment  Australian Department of the Parliamentary Library, Canberra.
 Australian Electoral Commission (2007) Referendum Dates and Results 1906 – Present AEC, Canberra.

1977 referendums
1977
Referendum
May 1977 events in Australia